Hugh McMillan may refer to:

Hugh McMillan (politician) (1839–1895), 19th century Quebec MP
Hugh McMillan (musician), Canadian rock/folk musician
Hugh McMillan (poet) (born 1955), Scottish poet and writer

See also
Hugh Macmillan (disambiguation)